Bedroom Eyes may refer to:

 Bedroom Eyes (film), a 1984 thriller film starring Kip Gilman and Barbara Law
 Bedroom Eyes (musician), indie pop singer and songwriter Jonas Jonsson
 "Bedroom Eyes" (song), 1989 song by Australian singer Kate Ceberano
 A facial expression often associated with sexual desire.